The Chevrolet Trailblazer is a subcompact crossover SUV produced by General Motors under the Chevrolet brand since 2020. It is slotted between the slightly smaller Trax and the compact Equinox.

Overview 
The Trailblazer was launched on April 16, 2019, at the 18th Shanghai International Automobile Industry Exhibition alongside the Tracker, that replaced the outgoing Trax. The Trailblazer is aimed for developed markets, while the Tracker is aimed for emerging markets. Developed by GM Korea, the Trailblazer is assembled in Incheon, South Korea while the Chinese market model is produced in Yantai, Shandong, China by SAIC-GM.

The Trailblazer made its North American debut at the Los Angeles Auto Show in November 2019, and sales began in early 2020 as a 2021 model year vehicle. There are five trim levels available: L, LS, LT, Activ and RS. The latter two came standard with dual exhaust and top of the line features. The Activ and RS models also feature a two-tone roof.

It was launched in the Philippines in October 2021. Imported from South Korea, it notably reused the nameplate from the previous Colorado-based Trailblazer which was discontinued in the same year.

On January 16, 2020, the Trailblazer was launched in South Korea.

United States 
In the United States, the 2021 Trailblazer is available in several trim levels: L, LS, LT, ACTIV, and RS. The L, LS, and LT are the "core" models of the Trailblazer lineup, and feature more traditional exterior styling. The ACTIV trim features a more rugged exterior appearance, while the RS trim features a sportier exterior appearance. In addition, the ACTIV and RS trims both offer a two-tone roof option. L, LS, and LT front-wheel-drive models came standard with the 1.2-liter three-cylinder turbocharged gasoline engine, while LS and LT all-wheel-drive models include the larger 1.3-liter three-cylinder turbocharged gasoline engine. The latter is also optional on the LT front-wheel-drive. All RS and Activ models, regardless of drivetrain, include the 1.3-liter engine as standard equipment. All FWD Trailblazers are equipped with continuously variable transmission as standard. AWD versions come with a 9-speed automatic.

Sales

References

External links 

 

Trailblazer (crossover)
Cars introduced in 2019
2020s cars
Mini sport utility vehicles
Crossover sport utility vehicles
Front-wheel-drive vehicles
All-wheel-drive vehicles
Vehicles with CVT transmission